Professor Donald Longmore OBE, FRCSEd, FRCR (born 1928) is a British consultant surgeon and clinical physiologist. He was one of the team who performed the first heart transplant in the United Kingdom.

Longmore was a Consultant Surgeon and Clinical Physiologist at the National Heart Hospital from 1963 to 1980. On 3 May 1968, together with Donald Ross and Keith Ross, he performed the first heart transplant in the United Kingdom, which was also only the eleventh in the world.

From 1982 to 1993 he worked as Professor of Magnetic Resonance in Medicine and Director of the Magnetic Resonance Unit, at the Royal Brompton National Heart and Lung Hospital, where he was latterly Emeritus.

He also holds management positions in companies delivering magnetic resonance services.

Longmore was made an Officer of the Order of the British Empire (OBE) in the 1999 New Year Honours, "for services to Magnetic Resonance Scanning". Imperial College named their "CORDA Donald Longmore PhD Fellowship" to honour Longmore. He is a Fellow of the Royal College of Surgeons of Edinburgh (FRCSEd) and a Fellow of the Royal College of Radiologists (FRCR).

Works

References

External links 

 

Place of birth missing
Year of death missing
Place of death missing
British surgeons
Fellows of the Royal College of Surgeons of Edinburgh
Fellows of the Royal College of Radiologists
Officers of the Order of the British Empire
1928 births